Ongudaysky District (Oñdoy aymak) is an administrative and municipal district (raion), one of the ten in the Altai Republic, Russia. It is located in the center of the republic. Its administrative center is the rural locality (a selo) of Onguday. As of the 2010 Census, the total population of the district was 15,046, with the population of Onguday accounting for 37.6% of that number.

Administrative and municipal status
Within the framework of administrative divisions, Ongudaysky District is one of the ten in the Altai Republic. As a municipal division, the district is incorporated as Ongudaysky Municipal District. Both administrative and municipal districts are divided into the same ten rural settlements, comprising thirty rural localities. The selo of Onguday serves as the administrative center of both the administrative and municipal district.

References

Notes

Sources

Districts of the Altai Republic
 
